The River Esk, sometimes called the Cumbrian Esk, is a river in Cumbria, England. It flows for approximately 25 km (15.5 miles) from its source in the Scafells range of mountains to its estuary at Ravenglass. It is one of two Rivers Esk in Cumbria, and not to be confused with the Border Esk which flows into Cumbria from Scotland.

Course 
The Esk rises in the Sca Fell range of mountains at a height of 800 metres, just below Esk Hause, the mountain pass between the fells of Great End and Esk Pike. The infant river then flows southerly through wild and picturesque countryside receiving many streams flowing off the Scafell range, the most significant of which are Calfcove Gill and Little Narrowcove Beck. The river makes several leaps over waterfalls including the Esk Falls before being joined by its first major tributary Lingcove Beck at Lingcove Bridge.  Within a few miles the Esk passes Brotherilkeld Farm, which formerly belonged to the monks of Furness Abbey, at this point it is joined by Hardknott Beck and the river now flows westerly through the farmland of Eskdale and is accompanied by the motor road which goes down the valley.

The Esk continues past the small villages of Boot and Eskdale Green. Just after Boot, the significant tributary of Whillan Beck joins the river from the north east, the beck being the outflow from Burnmoor Tarn, four km to the north. Continuing in a south westerly direction the Esk flows beneath Hinning House bridge, three km east of Ravenglass, at this point the river becomes tidal. Shortly after passing the Muncaster Castle Estate the river reaches the Irish Sea at Ravenglass. At its estuary the Esk is joined by the rivers Irt and Mite. The estuary has evolved over the centuries, the Esk and Irt were earlier separated by a shingle bank formed by the sea, dunes were formed when they eventually joined together. The estuary dunes are the location of the Eskmeals nature reserve, a Site of Special Scientific Interest (SSSI) over an area of 165.5 acres (67 hectares). The SSSI is made up of mostly coastal dunes and salt marsh attracting breeding birds and a profusion of flowers. The dunes are also the site of the Eskmeals Range, a shooting range owned by the MOD) and operated by the contractor Qinetiq.  The estuary is crossed by the Cumbrian Coast Line railway on the Eskmeals viaduct just south of Ravenglass.

Etymology
In his book The Origins Of English Place Names, P.H. Reaney says that the river's name is derived from the Brythonic word *Iska (abounding in fish) and cognate with the modern Welsh word Pysg (fishes). This derivation applies to many similarly named rivers throughout Britain including the Axe, Exe and Usk, with the names evolving local distinctions over the centuries.

Angling
The Esk has a reputation as a very good fishing river; it offers fine angling for sea trout and salmon. It was made famous by the writer and broadcaster Hugh Falkus, who lived in the Esk valley and used the river as a basis for many of his books and films. Many of the angling locations on the Esk are privately owned, although the Millom Angling Association offers daily tickets for visitors at its sites on the Muncaster Castle Estate and Brant Rake.

References

External links

Esk